
Gmina Mirzec is a rural gmina (administrative district) in Starachowice County, Świętokrzyskie Voivodeship, in south-central Poland.

Villages
Gmina Mirzec contains the villages and settlements of Gadka, Jagodne, Krupów, Krzewa, Małyszyn Dolny, Małyszyn Górny, Mirzec, Osiny, Ostrożanka, Trębowiec Duży, Trębowiec Mały, Tychów Nowy and Tychów Stary.

Neighbouring gminas
Gmina Mirzec is bordered by the gminas of Brody, Iłża, Mirów, Skarżysko Kościelne, Wąchock and Wierzbica.

References
Polish official population figures 2006

Mirzec
Starachowice County